Abby Lillian Marlatt (March 7, 1869 – June 23, 1943) was an American educator.

Born in Manhattan, Kansas, Marlatt graduated from Kansas State College with a B.S. in 1888. receiving her M.S. from the same institution in 1890.  After graduation, she taught home economics, beginning in Utah before going to Rhode Island.  In 1909, she came to the University of Wisconsin, where she became the first director of the home economics department.  She remained in this capacity until retiring, in 1939, with the title of professor emeritus.  She established a regular curriculum and provided students with more specialized work; besides emphasizing teaching and extension work, she advocated broad training with grounding in the arts and sciences.  During World War I she helped the state of Wisconsin to plan how to join in the national efforts towards conserving food.  She remained in Madison after her retirement, dying there in 1943.

Notes

References
Dictionary of Wisconsin History

See also
 Abby Lindsey Marlatt, Ph.D., her niece

1869 births
1943 deaths
People from Manhattan, Kansas
People from Madison, Wisconsin
Kansas State University alumni
University of Wisconsin–Madison faculty